Ian Cox (born 24 February 1967) is a former English cricketer.  Cox was a right-handed batsman who bowled right-arm medium pace.  He was born at Heathfield, Sussex.

Cox represented the Sussex Cricket Board in a single List A match against Hertfordshire in the 1999 NatWest Trophy, scoring 10 runs.

References

External links
Ian Cox at Cricinfo
Ian Cox at CricketArchive

1967 births
Living people
People from Heathfield, East Sussex
English cricketers
Sussex Cricket Board cricketers